Mike Benevides (born May 3, 1968) is a professional Canadian football coach. He most recently served as the defensive coordinator for the Ottawa Redblacks of the Canadian Football League (CFL). Benevides was the head coach for the BC Lions from 2012 though 2014, and more recently the defensive coordinator and assistant head coach for the Edmonton Eskimos. He played college football at the defensive tackle position for the Bakersfield College Renegades before transferring to York University to play for the Yeomen.

Professional career

Calgary Stampeders 
Benevides began his coaching career with the Calgary Stampeders in 2000 as a defensive assistant. He spent the following two seasons as the Stampeders' special teams and linebackers coach.

BC Lions 
Benevides then became the special teams and linebackers coach for the BC Lions in 2003. He was eventually promoted to defensive coordinator and eventually head coach in 2012. Benevides spent three seasons with the Lions as the team's head coach, winning 33 games and losing 21. Under his leadership the Lions made the playoffs each season, but lost every time. Following the 2014 season he was released by the Lions on November 20, 2014.

Edmonton Eskimos 
On January 14, 2016, the Edmonton Eskimos named Benevides their assistant head coach and defensive coordinator. On December 7, 2018, the Eskimos released Mike Benevides from his duties.

Ottawa Redblacks 
After spending a year working for TSN, Benevides was announced as the defensive coordinator for the Ottawa Redblacks on December 17, 2019. He served in that capacity for two seasons, but was not retained following a coaching change for the 2023 season.

CFL coaching record

References

External links
Career Bio

1968 births
Living people
BC Lions coaches
Calgary Stampeders coaches
Canadian people of Portuguese descent
Edmonton Elks coaches
Sportspeople from Toronto
Ottawa Redblacks coaches
York University alumni
York Lions football players